Edward Brigati Jr. (born October 22, 1945) is an American singer-songwriter. He was the co-lead vocalist, along with Felix Cavaliere, and percussionist in the rock group The Young Rascals from 1964 to 1970.

Prior to his stint with The Young Rascals (who later shortened their name to The Rascals), Brigati had been a member of Joey Dee and the Starliters (having replaced his brother, original Starliter David Brigati, in that group). With the help of group founder Billy (Smith) Amato and manager Sid Bernstein, the Rascals became the first all-white group signed to Atlantic Records. They (along with The Righteous Brothers and The Box Tops), were practitioners of a genre of music coined 'blue-eyed soul'.

Early life
Born and raised in Garfield, New Jersey, Brigati graduated from Garfield High School in 1963.

Career
Brigati and fellow group member Felix Cavaliere wrote the songs that made the Rascals one of the more successful recording groups of their era. He helped to compose "You Better Run", "I've Been Lonely Too Long", "Groovin'", "How Can I Be Sure" (with his lead vocals), "A Beautiful Morning", and "People Got to Be Free".

Brigati left the group in 1970 after their contract with Atlantic expired, and they chose to sign with Columbia. In 1976, Eddie and David Brigati recorded an album, Lost in the Wilderness, under the name Brigati.  They also performed on The New York Rock and Soul Revue: Live at the Beacon in 1992.

The (Young) Rascals were inducted into the Rock and Roll Hall of Fame in 1997 and in 2005, the Vocal Group Hall of Fame. On June 18, 2009, Brigati (along with partner Cavaliere) was inducted into the Songwriters Hall of Fame. On April 24, 2010, Brigati reunited with the other three members of the Rascals. They performed at the Kristen Ann Carr benefit (held at New York City's Tribeca Grill). The quartet played a set that ran over one hour and featured several of their top hits from the 1960s.

He reunited with his band-mates in 2012. The Rascals appeared at the Capitol Theater in Port Chester, NY for six shows in December 2012 and for fifteen dates at the Richard Rogers Theatre on Broadway (April 15 – May 5, 2013). The production was entitled 'Once Upon A Dream' and was produced by long-time Rascals' fans, Steven Van Zandt and his wife Maureen. They toured for seven months after Broadway. Tour dates included venues in Los Angeles, Philadelphia, Chicago, Phoenix, Clearwater, Jacksonville, Atlanta, Boston, Wantagh (NY), Holmdel (NJ), Atlantic City and Toronto, Canada.

On May, 8th 2017, Brigati debuted a cabaret show at the Cutting Room in New York City that was produced by Steven and Maureen Van Zandt. The show consisted of some Broadway tunes, some Brill Building hits as well as a song written for Brigati by Steven Van Zandt entitled 'Reintroduce Myself to Me'. After the month long residency at The Cutting Room, Brigati appeared at Tim McLoones Supper Club (Asbury Park, NJ) on August 4. He will appear again at McLoones on October 19.

Brigati performed with the Rockit! Live Foundation (a nonprofit organization that teaches young musicians ages 8 to 18 the rock ’n’ roll band experience) at their August 26, 2017 concert at the Count Basie Theater in Red Bank, New Jersey.

Personal life
Brigati and his wife, Susan Lovell, reside in his home state of New Jersey.

References

External links
The Rascals Appreciation Site

1945 births
Living people
American male singer-songwriters
American people of Italian descent
American rock singers
Singer-songwriters from New Jersey
People from Garfield, New Jersey
Garfield High School (New Jersey) alumni
The Rascals members
Tambourine players
Maracas players
The New York Rock and Soul Revue members